Baqir Jabr Al-Zubeidi, also known as Bayan Jabr Solagh, is a former commander of the Badr Brigades who served as the Finance Minister of Iraq in the government of Nouri al-Maliki. He served as Minister of Interior, in charge of the police, in the Iraqi Transitional Government and was Minister of Housing and Reconstruction of the Iraqi Governing Council. He is a senior member of the Shi'a United Iraqi Alliance as well as a leader in the Supreme Council for the Islamic Revolution in Iraq (SCIRI).

Born in 1946 in the Maysan Governorate, Jabr became a Shi'a activist while studying engineering at Baghdad University in the 1970s. He escaped to Iran amid former Iraqi President Saddam Hussein's crackdown on Shi'a political groups and joined the Supreme Council for the Islamic Revolution in Iraq (SCIRI). He later headed SCIRI's office in Syria. According to the Independent newspaper Jabr was a former commander of SCIRI's militia, the Badr Brigades.

Under Jabr's control the Interior Ministry in 2006 was accused by the United Nations human rights chief in Iraq, John Pace, of executing and torturing to death hundreds of Iraqis every month.

On 3 January 2006, his sister was reported kidnapped by Iraqi insurgents. She was released two weeks later after a ransom was paid by him.

References

External links 
 
 
 
 
 
 
 PBS FRONTLINE: Gangs of Iraq 17 April 2007
 Interview with Bayan Jabr, PBS FRONTLINE: Gangs of Iraq 21 November 2006

1946 births
Badr Brigade members
Living people
Iraqi Shia Muslims
University of Baghdad alumni
Interior ministers of Iraq
Finance ministers of Iraq